Kyra Simon (born 11 August 2002) is an Australian professional rugby league footballer who currently plays for the Newcastle Knights in the NRL Women's Premiership.

Background
Simon was born in Taree, New South Wales.

Playing career

Early years
In 2021, Simon played for the Newcastle Knights' Tarsha Gale Cup team, winning the Coach's award at the conclusion of the season. In November 2021, she joined the Knights' inaugural NRLW squad.

2022
In February, Simon played for the Indigenous All Stars against the Māori All Stars. In round 4 of the delayed 2021 NRL Women's season, she made her NRLW debut for the Knights against the St. George Illawarra Dragons.

References

External links
Newcastle Knights profile

2002 births
Australian female rugby league players
Indigenous Australian rugby league players
Newcastle Knights (NRLW) players
Rugby league props
Living people